Türklər is a village in the Lachin District of Azerbaijan.

References

Populated places in Lachin District